Charles Bennett may refer to:

Peers
 Charles Bennet, 1st Earl of Tankerville (1674–1722), British peer
 Charles Bennet, 2nd Earl of Tankerville (1697–1753), British peer and politician
 Charles Bennet, 3rd Earl of Tankerville (1716–1767), British peer and politician
 Charles Bennet, 4th Earl of Tankerville (1743–1822), cricket pioneer
 Charles Bennet, 5th Earl of Tankerville (1776–1859), British politician
 Charles Bennet, 6th Earl of Tankerville (1810–1899), British peer and Conservative politician

Politicians
 Charles Bennett (Australian politician) (1894–1968), member of the New South Wales Legislative Assembly
 Charles Bennett (high commissioner) (1913–1998), New Zealand soldier and public servant
 Charles E. Bennett (politician) (1910–2003), American Congressman
 Charles Fox Bennett (1793–1883), merchant and politician in Newfoundland
 Charles G. Bennett (1863–1914), American Congressman and Secretary of the Senate

Sportspeople
 Charles Bennett (athlete) (1870–1949), British track and field athlete
 Charles Bennett (cricketer) (1872–1921), English cricketer
 Charles Bennett (defensive end, born 1963), American football defensive end
 Charles Bennett (defensive end, born 1983), American football defensive end
 Charles Bennett (fighter) (born 1979), known as "Krazy Horse", mixed martial arts fighter
 Charles Bennett (footballer) (1882–?), English footballer
 Charlie Bennett (1854–1927), American baseball player
 Chuck Bennett (1907–1973), American football halfback and coach

Scientists and academics
 Charles E. Bennett (scholar) (1858–1921), American classical scholar 
 Charles H. Bennett (physicist) (born 1943), American physicist and information theorist
 Charles L. Bennett (born 1956), American astrophysicist

Other people
 Charles Bennett (actor) (1889–1943), American actor
 Charles Bennett (screenwriter) (1899–1995), English playwright and screenwriter
 Charles Alan Bennett, British barrister and judge
 Charles H. Bennett (illustrator) (1829–1867), Victorian illustrator who pioneered techniques in comic illustration
 Charles H. Bennett (soldier) (1811–1855), present at start of California Gold Rush
 Charles Harper Bennett (1840–1927), English photographer and inventor
 Charles Henry Allan Bennett, English Buddhist monk

See also
 Bennett (name)